Eila may refer to any of these:
Entente Internationale des Luthiers et Archetiers, an international society of professional violin and bow makers. 
Eila Campbell (1915–1994), English geographer and cartographer
Eila Hiltunen (1922–2003), a Finnish sculptor
Eila Ilmatar Juutilainen, a character from the Strike Witches anime
Eila Pellinen (1938–1977), a Finnish singer
Eila Kivikk'aho (1921–2004), Finnish poet.
Eila (film), a 2003 Finnish film